Steven Michael Henson (born February 2, 1968) is a retired American professional basketball player, who was selected by the Milwaukee Bucks in the 2nd round (44th overall) of the 1990 NBA draft.  He was an assistant basketball coach at the University of Oklahoma under his former college coach Lon Kruger. On April 1, 2016, Henson was hired as the head coach at the University of Texas at San Antonio and assumed his new position after the Sooners' exit from the NCAA tournament the following day.

College career
Henson played collegiately at Kansas State University, where he was named to the All-Big Eight Conference first team in 1989. He is Kansas State's all-time leader in assists, and remains in the top ten on the all-time NCAA career free throw percentage list, with a .900 mark.  He was also a track and field decathlete at Kansas State.

Professional career
In six seasons in the NBA, Henson played for the Bucks, Atlanta Hawks, Charlotte Hornets, Portland Trail Blazers, and Detroit Pistons. During his NBA career, Henson appeared in 238 games and averaged 3.1 points per game.

NBA career statistics

Regular season

|-
| align="left" | 1990–91
| align="left" | Milwaukee
| 68 || 0 || 10.1 || .418 || .333 || .905 || 0.8 || 1.9 || 0.5 || 0.0 || 3.1
|-
| align="left" | 1991–92
| align="left" | Milwaukee
| 50 || 1 || 7.7 || .361 || .479 || .793 || 0.8 || 1.6 || 0.3 || 0.0 || 3.0
|-
| align="left" | 1992–93
| align="left" | Atlanta
| 53 || 2 || 13.6 || .390 || .463 || .850 || 1.0 || 2.9 || 0.6 || 0.0 || 4.0
|-
| align="left" | 1993–94
| align="left" | Charlotte
| 3 || 0 || 5.7 || .500 || 1.000 || .000 || 0.3 || 1.7 || 0.0 || 0.0 || 1.0
|-
| align="left" | 1994–95
| align="left" | Portland
| 37 || 0 || 10.3 || .430 || .442 || .880 || 0.7 || 2.3 || 0.2 || 0.0 || 3.2
|-
| align="left" | 1997–98
| align="left" | Detroit
| 23 || 0 || 2.8 || .500 || .375 || 1.000 || 0.1 || 0.2 || 0.0 || 0.0 || 1.6
|-
| align="left" | 1998–99
| align="left" | Detroit
| 4 || 0 || 6.3 || .500 || .000 || 1.000 || 0.0 || 0.8 || 0.3 || 0.0 || 1.0
|- class="sortbottom"
| style="text-align:center;" colspan="2"| Career
| 238 || 3 || 9.6 || .403 || .432 || .869 || 0.7 || 2.0 || 0.4 || 0.0 || 3.1
|}

Playoffs

|-
| align="left" | 1990–91
| align="left" | Milwaukee
| 3 || 0 || 13.3 || .500 || .667 || .750 || 1.0 || 1.0 || 0.3 || 0.0 || 5.7
|-
| align="left" | 1992–93
| align="left" | Atlanta
| 3 || 0 || 15.7 || .333 || .400 || .000 || 1.3 || 1.7 || 1.3 || 0.0 || 2.7
|- class="sortbottom"
| style="text-align:center;" colspan="2"| Career
| 6 || 0 || 14.5 || .429 || .500 || .750 || 1.2 || 1.3 || 0.8 || 0.0 || 4.2
|}

Coaching career
Since retiring from playing basketball, Henson has turned to coaching. He has been an assistant at Illinois, with the Atlanta Hawks, at South Florida, at UNLV and at Oklahoma.
After a successful 2015–16 season with the Oklahoma Sooners to the 2016 Final Four in Houston, Henson was announced to succeed Brooks Thompson as the new head coach for UTSA.

UTSA (2016–present)

In his first year of coaching, Henson engaged in a major rebuilding effort after succeeding Thompson as head coach. In his first year, UTSA posted a nine-win improvement in the overall record, going to 14–19 and a five-win improvement in Conference USA conference games to 8–10. In his second season, Henson posted a winning record for the first time since 2011–12, going 20–15 for the season and 11–7 in conference play, and being named the conference coach of the year. The UTSA Roadrunners lost in the quarterfinals of the 2018 C-USA tournament, but secured an invite into the 2018 CIT tournament.

Head Coaching Record

College

References

External links 
 Steve Henson's stats @ Basketball-reference.com
 UNLV's Henson biography

1968 births
Living people
American expatriate basketball people in Greece
American expatriate basketball people in Italy
American expatriate basketball people in Mexico
American men's basketball coaches
American men's basketball players
Atlanta Hawks players
Basketball coaches from Kansas
Basketball players from Kansas
Charlotte Hornets players
Fargo-Moorhead Fever players
Grand Rapids Hoops players
Illinois Fighting Illini men's basketball coaches
Kansas State Wildcats men's basketball players
La Crosse Catbirds players
Mexico Aztecas players
Milwaukee Bucks draft picks
Milwaukee Bucks players
Oklahoma Sooners men's basketball coaches
Pallacanestro Virtus Roma players
People from Junction City, Kansas
Point guards
Portland Trail Blazers players
Rapid City Thrillers players
South Florida Bulls men's basketball coaches
UNLV Runnin' Rebels basketball coaches
UTSA Roadrunners men's basketball coaches
Victoria Libertas Pallacanestro players